Lithium silicate may refer to:

Lithium metasilicate, an inorganic chemical compound with the formula Li2SiO3, used in calibrating thermocouples
Lithium orthosilicate, an inorganic chemical compoud with the formula Li4SiO4, used as a carbon dioxide scrubber